Nature Arabic Edition  is an online publication by Springer Nature (SN) in partnership with the King Abdulaziz City for Science and Technology. The magazine was started in 2012. It contains high-quality science news from the original Nature journal. The content of this journal is available online for free.

See also
 List of magazines in Saudi Arabia
 Nature Research

References

External links
Nature Arabic Edition website

2012 establishments in Saudi Arabia
Arabic-language magazines
Arabic-language websites
Magazines established in 2012
Mass media in Riyadh
Online magazines
Magazines published in Saudi Arabia
Science and technology magazines
Science and technology in Saudi Arabia